Octavarium is the eighth studio album by American progressive metal band Dream Theater. Released on June 7, 2005, it was the band's final release with Atlantic Records. Recorded between September 2004 and February 2005, it was the last album recorded at The Hit Factory in New York City. With it, the band decided to create "a classic Dream Theater album", drawing upon their various stylistic influences while trying to make the music less complex. The album takes its creative concept from the musical octave.

Octavarium peaked in the top five in the Finnish, Italian, and Swedish charts, and in the top ten in the Dutch, Japanese, and Norwegian charts. Critical reception of the album was generally positive; the diversity of the music was praised, although critics found some of the songwriting to be inconsistent. Dream Theater promoted the album on a year-long world tour, with the majority of concerts lasting almost three hours and featuring a different setlist each night. The tour finished at Radio City Music Hall accompanied by an orchestra; this performance was recorded and released as a live album and concert video entitled Score. They co-headlined the 2005 North American Gigantour with Megadeth.

Background
After completing a North American tour supporting one of their main influences, Yes, in summer 2004, Dream Theater took a two-month break. The band reconvened at The Hit Factory in New York City in November 2004 to begin work on their eighth studio album. The Hit Factory, a studio in which artists such as Michael Jackson, Madonna, Stevie Wonder, U2 and John Lennon had recorded, was earmarked for closure. Dream Theater was the last band to record there before it was permanently closed.

After writing the concept album Metropolis Pt. 2: Scenes from a Memory, the double album Six Degrees of Inner Turbulence and the metal-focused Train of Thought, the band decided to create "a classic Dream Theater album". Keyboardist Jordan Rudess described it as "really going back to creating a real band effort, as well as drawing upon all our various stylistic influences." On Octavarium, the band wanted to make the music less complex, featuring songs which Rudess regards as "quicker to appreciate", although noted that the twenty-four-minute "Octavarium" was not as accessible. Guitarist John Petrucci noted that they wanted to focus on writing strong songs. To achieve this, the band stripped the sound down to piano, guitar and vocals when writing, focusing on the melodies and song structures.

Drummer Mike Portnoy dismissed claims that Octavarium was an attempt to write a more commercial album, stating that the band simply "[has] that side to [them]. We love bands like U2 or Coldplay, as well as liking shorter songs as well." Portnoy noted that, after writing Six Degrees of Inner Turbulence and Train of Thought, they had not written an album of shorter songs for some time. He said that the band had found writing longer songs easier than writing shorter ones, and that the band was not trying to write a radio hit as "the label wouldn't have done crap with it anyway."

The band had previously written an orchestral-style piece in the form of "Overture" on Six Degrees of Inner Turbulence, but recorded it using keyboards. The tracks "The Answer Lies Within", "Sacrificed Sons" and "Octavarium" marked the first time Dream Theater worked with an orchestra, conducted by Jamshied Sharifi (who studied at Berklee College of Music at the same time as Portnoy, Petrucci and bassist John Myung). The orchestra was selected based on their sight reading ability, allowing all their parts to be recorded in a maximum of two takes, even though they had never seen or played the music before.

Sharifi would later go on to conduct the Octavarium Orchestra on Dream Theater's Score album.

Concept
When starting to work on what would become Octavarium, Portnoy noted that it would be their eighth studio album and that they had recently released their fifth live album, Live at Budokan. This sequence mirrored the octave on a musical keyboard: each octave contains eight naturals and five accidentals. Portnoy suggested that they use that concept for the entire album. When writing, the band delegated each song a different key. Sound effects were placed between songs to connect them: for example, "The Root of All Evil", written in F minor, and the following track, "The Answer Lies Within", written in G minor, were connected by a sound effect in the key of F♯ minor. The album's lyrics and song titles featured references to this concept. Portnoy cited the titles "The Root of all Evil" (referring to the musical term "root") and "Octavarium" ("the octave of the octave") as two examples of this.

Octavarium begins "The Root of All Evil" with the final note of the band's previous album, Train of Thought with "In the Name of God". Train of Thought started "As I Am" with the last note from Six Degrees of Inner Turbulence with the title track, which in turn started with the noise that ended Scenes from a Memory at the end of "Finally Free". Portnoy was inspired to do this thanks to the Van Halen album Women and Children First; the outro of the album's final song ended with a new riff being played which faded out. Portnoy recalled that he expected Van Halen's next album to start with that ending riff, but was disappointed when it did not. He later realized he had "dug a hole where we're expected to do it every time". He solved this problem on Octavarium, where the final track ends with the beginning of the first one. This made the album a cycle in itself, allowing the band to have a clean start with their next album. At 04:52–05:17, there is a lyrical and musical reference to the chorus of "This Dying Soul" from Train of Thought. This reference comes from Portnoy’s Twelve-step Suite. All of the negative time sections on the CD version were omitted on the digital versions initially, but later made available again.

Content
"The Root of All Evil" is the third part of Portnoy's Twelve-step Suite, a set of songs from various Dream Theater albums which describe his journey through Alcoholics Anonymous. The song contains parts six and seven of the suite: "Ready" and "Remove". "The Answer Lies Within" and "I Walk Beside You" are the two shortest tracks on the album. Rudess regards them as radio-friendly songs which still maintain Dream Theater's style.

Portnoy wrote the lyrics to "Never Enough" as a response to fans who Portnoy perceived to complain about every thing that Dream Theater did. Portnoy stated that while he appreciated the devotion of Dream Theater's fans, he was frustrated because he was "constantly tearing [himself] away from [his] family" to give more to the fans. He found it discouraging that, even though he spent "countless nights" writing special setlists and the band spent days rehearsing, some fans would still complain that they went to a show and did not hear "Pull Me Under". "It's discouraging and makes me crazy sometimes," he said.

"Sacrificed Sons", at almost eleven minutes long, is the second-longest song on the album. Its lyrics, written by vocalist James LaBrie, deal with the September 11 attacks. Rudess noted that the band enjoyed writing about more serious topics instead of love songs. When working on the lyrics, LaBrie said that there was "a lot of discussion" about the song's wording and how direct it should be.

The title track, "Octavarium", is the longest track on the album, at 24:00, and divided into five parts. Petrucci stated that the band wanted to write an epic song that thematically developed and would use an orchestra. The band was heavily influenced by the progressive rock sound of Genesis, Yes and Pink Floyd. The instrumental introduction, heavily influenced by Pink Floyd's "Shine On You Crazy Diamond", was performed by Rudess using a lap steel guitar and Continuum. Additionally, there are many references to other progressive rock songs in the lyrics. The song ends with the introductory theme of "The Root of All Evil" before fading out (instead there is an alternative version for some releases, with the reprise flute from the first part of "Octavarium" playing in the background). The ending establishes a cyclical theme to the album, and breaks the continuity of the meta-album established since Scenes from a Memory, thus allowing the band the opportunity for a fresh start on the next album.

Artwork
Hugh Syme provided the artwork for Octavarium. The idea of depicting a giant Newton's cradle was born out of discussions between Syme and Portnoy. The two talked about how "for everything you do in music you create either a cluster or triad", according to Syme. "And then it became evident that for every action there is an opposite reaction. So I thought we could do something based on the Newton's cradle." There are numerous references to the numbers five and eight throughout the artwork, alluding to the album's concept. For example, the Newton's cradle has eight suspended balls, and there are five birds on the cover. The album booklet features an octagonal maze, spider and octopus, among other references. The landscape on the cover is made up of a sky and grass from Indiana, and a background from the Lake District. Octavarium marked the beginning of an extended association with the band for Syme. He would go on to provide the artwork for all the following studio albums (apart from The Astonishing) and most of the following live releases.

Release
A week before the scheduled release of Octavarium, Portnoy shut down the official Dream Theater and Mike Portnoy forums. Blabbermouth.net reported that this was in response to the album being leaked. Portnoy stated that "[he] chose to do this mainly [emphasis removed] to build anticipation for the big 'official' unveiling next week", although noted that "the repeated requests to refrain from spoilers and links for the new album against the band's wishes were frustrating".

Octavarium was released on June 7, 2005. It was their final album with Atlantic Records, ending a contract which had lasted fourteen years. Although in recent years the band had been allowed creative freedom, they were dissatisfied by the lack of promotion the label offered them. Portnoy released a DVD entitled Drumavarium in 2005, containing footage of his drum performance from the Octavarium recording sessions. Rudess released a solo piano version of "The Answer Lies Within" on his 2009 album Notes on a Dream. "Panic Attack" is featured as a playable song in Rock Band 2, where it is listed as the hardest song for both bass and drums.

Reception

Octavarium reached the top five in the Finnish, Italian, and Swedish charts, as well as the top ten in the Dutch, Japanese, and Norwegian charts. Critical reception of the album was generally positive. Writing for Blistering, Justin Donnelly praised the album as "diverse, melodic and hard hitting all at the same time", ranking it as one of Dream Theater's best releases. He particularly praised the title track, considering it to be "another Dream Theater classic". Billboard considered the results of the band's attempt to write shorter songs and use warmer instrumental textures to be "excellent", particularly praising "The Root of All Evil", "These Walls" and "I Walk Beside You".

Harley Carlson of MetalReview.com regarded Octavarium as "successfully [showcasing] the band's ability to craft emotive music," although noted that it is "unquestionably Dream Theater, yet there is something missing." Vik Bansal of musicOMH praised "Never Enough", "Panic Attack" and "Sacrificed Sons", but dismissed "The Root of All Evil" as "Dream Theater by the numbers". He criticized "Octavarium" as "bloated", although noted that fans of the band's A Change of Seasons would enjoy it. He said that "there's enough on the remainder of Octavarium to keep the rest of us interested and the prog rock haters whining dismissively". Writing for Exclaim!, Greg Pratt praised the album's artwork and production, but said that "there’s nothing that blows any minds here, or even gives a mild bend; hell, a good chunk of this disc feels like basic radio rock from the local old-guy bar band". He noted that although there were some longer songs on the album, "this just feels like 76 minutes of overdramatic rock, too heavy on the light and weak, and not enough time spent on just showing off".

Donnelly considered Octavarium to be "somewhere between Images and Words, Six Degrees of Inner Turbulence and Train of Thought". Carlson stated that the album "draws closest comparison to Falling into Infinity and Metropolis II: Scenes from a Memory, but with far less complexity and edge." Tammy La Gorce of AllMusic noted that "a post-hardcore edge - call it a leap into 2005 - has invaded [the band's] pledge of allegiance to theatrical heavy rock... What's changed is Dream Theater's commitment to carrying on their reputation as underground progressive rock's classicists, and it seems well-timed." Critics noted a strong Muse influence on some tracks, on some cases generating negative reviews.

Touring

Dream Theater began the Octavarium Tour in support of Octavarium in Europe on June 10, 2005, beginning at the Sweden Rock Festival in Sölvesborg. The band co-headlined the Gigantour with Megadeth across North America from July 21 to September 3. The Montreal concert was recorded and released as a live album and concert video on August 22, 2006 and September 5, 2006 respectively, titled Gigantour. The main Octavarium world tour began in September in Finland, and saw the band continue with their "An Evening With Dream Theater" concert format. This meant the band would play for almost three hours, with a different setlist each evening. Many of the shows would center around a tour of the band's history to that point, featuring a song (or part of a longer song) for each album before wrapping up the regular set with several from Octavarium. Combined with interviews, rehearsals during soundcheck and meet-and-greet sessions with fans, the band became physically and mentally drained.

Dream Theater performed two shows on consecutive nights both in Amsterdam and London. On the second night in both cities, the band covered the entirety of Pink Floyd's The Dark Side of the Moon album. Theresa Thomason, who had previously performed on Scenes From a Memory, was flown in to perform vocals on "The Great Gig in the Sky". The London performance was released as a live album and concert video in 2006 by Portnoy's YtseJam Records. The band covered all of Deep Purple's Made in Japan at concerts in Tokyo and Osaka; a recording of which was also released as a live album by YtseJam Records in 2007.

To celebrate the band's twentieth anniversary, the final concert on the tour was performed at Radio City Music Hall in New York on April 1, 2006. For the second half of the concert, the band was accompanied by a thirty-piece orchestra conducted by Jamshied Sharifi. The concert was filmed and released as a live album and concert video named Score on August 29, 2006 by Rhino Records.

Track listing

Personnel

Dream Theater
James LaBrie – vocals
John Petrucci – guitars, vocals, producer
Jordan Rudess – keyboards, Continuum, lap steel guitar
John Myung – bass
Mike Portnoy – drums, vocals, percussion, producer, art concept
Additional personnel
Orchestra on "Sacrificed Sons" and "Octavarium"
Elena Barere – concertmaster
Katherine Fong, Ann Lehmann, Katherine Livolsi-Stern, Laura McGinniss, Catherine Ro, Ricky Sortomme, Yuri Vodovoz – violins
Vincent Lionti, Karen Dreyfus – violas
Richard Locker, Jeanne LeBlanc – celli
Pamela Sklar – flute
Joe Anderer, Stewart Rose – French horns
String quartet on "The Answer Lies Within"
Elena Barere – first violin
Carol Webb – second violin
Vincent Lionti – viola
Richard Locker – cello
Jamshied Sharifi – strings arrangement, conductor
Jill Dell'Abate - orchestral contractor

Technical personnel
Doug Oberkircher – engineer
Colleen Culhane, Kaori Kinoshita, Ryan Simms – assistant engineers
Bert Baldwin – additional studio assistance
Michael H. Brauer – mixing
Keith Gary – assistant and Pro Tools engineer
Will Hensley – second assistant
George Marino – mastering
Hugh Syme – art direction, design, illustration, art concept
Colin Lane – photography

Chart positions

References

Dream Theater albums
2005 albums
Atlantic Records albums
Concept albums